The 1995–96 NCAA Division I men's basketball season concluded in the 64-team 1996 NCAA Division I men's basketball tournament whose finals were held at the Continental Airlines Arena in East Rutherford, New Jersey. The Kentucky Wildcats earned their sixth national championship by defeating the Syracuse Orangemen 76–67 on April 1, 1996. They were coached by Rick Pitino and the NCAA basketball tournament Most Outstanding Player was Kentucky's Tony Delk.

In the 32-team 1997 National Invitation Tournament, the Nebraska Cornhuskers defeated the St. Joseph's Hawks at Madison Square Garden in New York City.

Following the season, the 1996 NCAA Men's Basketball All-American Consensus First team included Ray Allen, Marcus Camby, Tony Delk, Tim Duncan, Allen Iverson, and Kerry Kittles.

Season headlines 
 Rick Pitino led the Kentucky Wildcats to its sixth National Championship, his first.

Pre-season polls 
The top 25 from the pre-season AP Poll.

Conference membership changes 

These schools joined new conferences for the 1995–96 season.

Regular season

Conference winners and tournaments 
29 conference seasons concluded with a single-elimination tournament, with only the Big Ten Conference, Ivy League and the Pac-10 Conference choosing not to conduct conference tournaments. Conference tournament winners, with the exception of the American West Conference received an automatic bid to the NCAA tournament.

Statistical leaders

Postseason tournaments

NCAA tournament

Final Four – RCA Dome, Indianapolis, Indiana

National Invitation tournament

Semifinals & finals 

 Third Place – Tulane 87, Alabama 76

Award winners

Consensus All-American teams

Major player of the year awards 
 Wooden Award: Marcus Camby, Massachusetts
 Naismith Award: Marcus Camby, Massachusetts
 Associated Press Player of the Year: Marcus Camby, Massachusetts
 NABC Player of the Year: Marcus Camby, Massachusetts
 Oscar Robertson Trophy (USBWA): Marcus Camby, Massachusetts
 Adolph Rupp Trophy: Marcus Camby, Massachusetts
 Sporting News Player of the Year: Marcus Camby, Massachusetts
 UPI College Basketball Player of the Year: Ray Allen, Connecticut

Major freshman of the year awards 
 USBWA Freshman of the Year: No Award Given

Major coach of the year awards 
 Associated Press Coach of the Year: Gene Keady, Purdue
 Henry Iba Award (USBWA): Gene Keady, Purdue
 NABC Coach of the Year: John Calipari, Massachusetts
 Naismith College Coach of the Year: John Calipari, Massachusetts
 Sporting News Coach of the Year: John Calipari, Massachusetts

Other major awards 
 NABC Defensive Player of the Year: Tim Duncan, Wake Forest
 Frances Pomeroy Naismith Award (Best player under 6'0): Eddie Benton, Vermont
 Robert V. Geasey Trophy (Top player in Philadelphia Big 5): Kerry Kittles, Villanova
 NIT/Haggerty Award (Top player in New York City metro area): Adrian Griffin, Seton Hall

Coaching changes 

A number of teams changed coaches during the season and after it ended.

References